The 2018 AFC Futsal Club Championship was the 9th edition of the AFC Futsal Club Championship, an annual international futsal club tournament in Asia organised by the Asian Football Confederation (AFC). It was held in Yogyakarta, Indonesia between 1–12 August 2018.

In the final, Mes Sungun defeated Thái Sơn Nam to win their first title. Chonburi Bluewave were the defending champions, but were eliminated in the quarter-final VS Bank of Beirut

Teams
Of the 47 AFC member associations, a total of 16 associations teams entered the competition, each entering one team. There was no qualification, and all entrants advanced to the final tournament.

All 14 associations which participated in the 2017 AFC Futsal Club Championship returned for 2018. Moreover, South Korea entered a team for the first time ever, and Myanmar entered a team for the first time since 2012, when they participated in qualification.

Venues

Draw
The draw was held on 18 May 2018, 11:00 WIB (UTC+7), at the Fairmont Hotel in Jakarta. The 16 teams were drawn into four groups of four teams. The teams were seeded according to their association's performance in the 2017 AFC Futsal Club Championship, with the team from hosts Indonesia automatically seeded and assigned to Position A1 in the draw.

Squads

Each team must register a squad of 14 players, minimum two of whom must be goalkeepers (Regulations Articles 30.1 and 30.2).

Group stage
The top two teams of each group advance to the quarter-finals.

Tiebreakers
Teams are ranked according to points (3 points for a win, 1 point for a draw, 0 points for a loss), and if tied on points, the following tiebreaking criteria are applied, in the order given, to determine the rankings (Regulations Article 10.5):
Points in head-to-head matches among tied teams;
Goal difference in head-to-head matches among tied teams;
Goals scored in head-to-head matches among tied teams;
If more than two teams are tied, and after applying all head-to-head criteria above, a subset of teams are still tied, all head-to-head criteria above are reapplied exclusively to this subset of teams;
Goal difference in all group matches;
Goals scored in all group matches;
Penalty shoot-out if only two teams are tied and they met in the last round of the group;
Disciplinary points (yellow card = 1 point, red card as a result of two yellow cards = 3 points, direct red card = 3 points, yellow card followed by direct red card = 4 points);
Drawing of lots.

All times are local, WIB (UTC+7).

Group A

Group B

Group C

Group D

Knockout stage
In the knockout stage, extra time and penalty shoot-out are used to decide the winner if necessary, except for the third place match where penalty shoot-out (no extra time) is used to decide the winner if necessary (Regulations Articles 14.1 and 15.1).

Bracket

Quarter-finals

Semi-finals

Third place match

Final

Winners

Awards

All-Star Team

Top goalscorers

Tournament team rankings

References

External links
, the-AFC.com
AFC Futsal Club Championship 2018, stats.the-AFC.com

2018
Club Championship
2018 Afc Futsal Club Championship
2018 in Indonesian football
Sports competitions in Yogyakarta
August 2018 sports events in Asia